
Lionel may refer to:

Name
Lionel (given name)

Places
Lionel, Lewis, a village in the Outer Hebrides of Scotland
Lionel Town, Jamaica, a settlement

Brands and enterprises
Lionel, LLC, an American designer and importer of toy trains and model railroads, which owns the trademarks and most of the product rights associated with Lionel Corp., but is not directly related
Lionel Corporation, an American manufacturer and retailer of toy trains and model railroads

Other uses
Lionel (bridge), a defense in the game of bridge